The Government of Western Australia, formally referred to as His Majesty's Government of Western Australia, is the Australian state democratic administrative authority of Western Australia. It is also commonly referred to as the WA Government or the Western Australian Government. The Government of Western Australia, a parliamentary constitutional monarchy, was formed in 1890 as prescribed in its Constitution, as amended from time to time. Since the Federation of Australia in 1901, Western Australia has been a state of the Commonwealth of Australia, and the Constitution of Australia regulates its relationship with the Commonwealth.  Under the Australian Constitution, Western Australia ceded legislative and judicial supremacy to the Commonwealth, but retained powers in all matters not in conflict with the Commonwealth.

History

Executive and judicial powers
Western Australia is governed according to the principles of the Westminster system, a form of parliamentary government based on the model of the United Kingdom. Legislative power rests with the Parliament of Western Australia, which consists of Charles III, King of Australia, represented by the Governor of Western Australia, and the two Houses, the Western Australian Legislative Council (the upper house) and the Western Australian Legislative Assembly (the lower house). Executive power rests formally with the Executive Council, which consists of the Governor and senior ministers.

The Governor, as representative of the Crown, is the formal repository of power, which is exercised by him or her on the advice of the Premier of Western Australia and the Cabinet. The Premier and Ministers are appointed by the Governor, and hold office by virtue of their ability to command the support of a majority of members of the Legislative Assembly. Judicial power is exercised by the Supreme Court of Western Australia and a system of subordinate courts, but the High Court of Australia and other federal courts have overriding jurisdiction on matters which fall under the ambit of the Australian Constitution.

Ministries

, the following individuals serve as government ministers, at the pleasure of the King, represented by the Governor of Western Australia. The government cabinet and ministers are listed in order of seniority, while their opposition counterparts are listed to correspond with the government ministers. All ministers and shadow ministers are members of the Parliament of Western Australia.

See also 

 List of Western Australian government agencies
 State constitution (Australia)

References

External links
Government of Western Australia website

The Parliament of Western Australia website
The Premier of Western Australia website

 
1890 establishments in Australia